Major-General Robert Auld  (1 October 1848 – 17 February 1911) was a British Army officer who became Lieutenant Governor of Guernsey.

Military career
Auld was commissioned into the 5th Regiment of Foot in 1869. He was appointed Aide-de-camp to the Governor of Malta in 1878, Deputy Assistant Quartermaster General at Headquarters Southern District in 1882 and Deputy Assistant Adjutant General at Headquarters Ireland in 1889. He went on to be Commander of the Mounted Infantry at Aldershot Command in 1892, Assistant Adjutant General at Headquarters North Western District in 1894 and Assistant Adjutant General at Headquarters Southern District in 1897. His next appointments were as Assistant Director General of Ordnance in 1899, Assistant Quartermaster General at Army Headquarters (War Office) later in 1899 and Deputy Quartermaster General at Army Headquarters on 7 April 1902. Finally he became Director of Supplies and Clothing in 1904, Commander of the Infantry Brigade at Gibraltar in 1905 and Lieutenant Governor of Guernsey in 1908.

He lived at Saumarez Park in Guernsey and died in office in 1911.

References

External links

1848 births
1911 deaths
Companions of the Order of the Bath
Royal Northumberland Fusiliers officers
British Army major generals